Rolando Guaves (born 8 January 1945) is a former Filipino cyclist. He competed in the sprint and the 1000m time trial at the 1968 Summer Olympics.

References

External links
 

1945 births
Living people
Filipino male cyclists
Olympic cyclists of the Philippines
Cyclists at the 1968 Summer Olympics
People from Misamis Occidental
Asian Games medalists in cycling
Cyclists at the 1966 Asian Games
Cyclists at the 1970 Asian Games
Cyclists at the 1974 Asian Games
Cyclists at the 1978 Asian Games
Medalists at the 1970 Asian Games
Asian Games silver medalists for the Philippines
Asian Games bronze medalists for the Philippines